Beyond is a 1921 American drama silent film based on the play The Lifted Veil by Henry Arthur Jones. The film was directed by William Desmond Taylor and produced by Jesse L. Lasky. It stars Ethel Clayton, Charles Meredith and Earl Schenck. The feature was distributed by Paramount Pictures and was set in part in New Zealand.

Plot

Cast
Ethel Clayton as Avis Langley
Charles Meredith as Geoffrey Southerne
Earl Schenck as Alec Langley
Fontaine La Rue as Mrs. Langley
Winifred Kingston as Viva Newmarch
Lillian Rich as Bessie Ackroyd
Charles K. French as Samuel Ackroyd
Spottiswoode Aitken as Rufus Southerne
Herbert Fortier as Dr. Newmarch

Background

The director, William Taylor told the Los Angeles Times in 1921 that, "motion pictures are in their occult age...mysticism has a strong grip on popular fancy, there are those who absorb with avidity every new idea in the subject, from the ouija board on. Others believe strongly in some one phase. But all, total scoffers included, are interested in what is said and done on the subject".

Reviews and reception
Reviews for the film were generally mediocre. The New York Daily Telegraph (September 11, 1921) praised Clayton's performance saying she did "exceedingly well with the role of the daughter", and noted that the film "would not hold one's attention so well were it not for the star [Clayton] and the well thought out direction of William D. Taylor". The Moving Picture World (September 17, 1921) said of the film, "the big dramatic points seem to miss fire and the death of the second wife [is] a trick of the dramatist’s to bring about a happy ending". J. S. Dickerson's review in the Motion Picture News (September 11, 1921) was critical of the film saying, "the ghost of Ethel's mother shows up every so often to explain that everything will come out all right, but she never tells her anything that will aid in bringing this about...About the only place [Beyond] may be expected to go over is at a spiritualistic camp meeting...it has no theme worthy of respect nor technical construction unusual enough to command interest".

Preservation
Beyond is preserved incomplete at the Library of Congress with only three of the five reels.

See also
My Favorite Wife (1940)
Cast Away (2000)

References

External links

1921 films
American silent feature films
Films directed by William Desmond Taylor
Paramount Pictures films
1921 in New Zealand
1921 drama films
Silent American drama films
Famous Players-Lasky films
American black-and-white films
1920s American films